Maha Thanmada Wuntha or more commonly known as Yazawin Kyaw (the Celebrated Chronicle) is an early 16th-century chronicle of Buddhist religious history and Burmese history.

The chronicle was written in two parts by Shin Maha Silavamsa, the famous learned monk, author and poet. The first part, written in 1502, is mainly a religious history document, and essentially a Burmese version of the Mahavamsa and Dipavamsa. The first part focuses on the kings of ancient India and Ceylon, according to Buddhist mythology and history. In 1520, the author added a supplement about the Burmese kings down to 1496. In all, only one-seventh of the treatise concerns the affairs of Burmese kings as it was not intended to be an authoritative chronicle. The author stated there was already an existing chronicle of the Ava court.

References

Bibliography
 
 
 
 

1502 books
1520 books
16th-century history books
Burmese chronicles
Burmese Buddhist texts
History of Myanmar